Christopher Tucker (1946–2022) is a British make-up artist for theatre and film.

Christopher Tucker may also refer to:

Chris Tucker (born 1971), American actor and comedian